Abu Bakr Ibn Al-Qutia (died 997) was a historian and author born in Córdoba, Spain. His mother was a Goth of royal lineage. His important historical account of Spain up to the Caliph of Cordoba Abd-ar-Rahman III (912–961) has been edited by Pascual de Gayangos, and published with the translation of Julián Ribera y Tarragó as Historia de la conquista de España (1926).

Notes

997 deaths
Historians of Spain
Year of birth unknown